Paracraga necoda is a moth in the family Dalceridae. It was described by Herbert Druce in 1901. It is found in Colombia, Ecuador and Venezuela.

The length of the forewings is 9–11 mm for males and 16 mm for females. Adults are on wing in March, June and July.

References

Moths described in 1901
Dalceridae
Moths of South America